Coaches Across Continents is a UK and US based NGO aimed at improving the quality of life in low-income countries through soccer for social development.

History
Coaches Across Continents was launched in June 2008 based on first-hand research in 60 countries. In its first year, the organization implemented programs at a site in Tanzania. In 2009, it expanded its program to sites in Malawi and Zambia. Since then it has expanded to work in 37 total countries and 5 continents. CAC is now approaching the 10 year anniversary of the organization.

Awards
2010 Featured Finalist Global Sports Forum Football for Education in Barcelona.

2009, the project won the Best New Project for Sport and Development at the inaugural Beyond Sport Awards in London. 

Finalist for the 2009 SCORE4africa Football for Diversity Award

References
 Daley, John. Soccer and Survival. Harvard Magazine.
 Coaches Across Continents.
 Cuttone, Charles. Sights on Africa. New England Soccer News.
 Bradley, Jeff. This is Africa. ESPN The Magazine.
 10 in 2010. Kick For Hope.
 Our 2010 Vision, Mission and Values: Creating locally owned, sustainable programs. Coaches Across Continents.
 Coaches across Continents Hat-Trick Initiatives Beyond Sport.
 Coaches across Continents Hat-Trick Initiatives Beyond Sport.
 Score4Africa Press Release 10-30-2009 Score4Africa.
 Nominees Global Sports Forum.

Further Information
Coaches Across Continents Website
Sporting Communities Blog

Association football organizations